OGV may stand for:
Ordinary goods vehicle
The Theora video compression format (.OGV)